LOV may refer to:
 LOV-1, a Croatian armoured personnel carrier
 Light-Oxygen-Voltage-sensing domain, in proteins
 Monclova International Airport IATA code